Denise Boutte (born January 19, 1982) is an American actress and model, who has appeared in the films Why Did I Get Married? as Trina, Death Valley: The Revenge of Bloody Bill, as Mandy, Sister's Keeper and Noah's Arc.

Career
She starred in the sitcom Meet the Browns as Sasha Brown.

Filmography

Film and TV Movies

Television

References

External links

Denise Boutte on Myspace

Louisiana State University alumni
Living people
People from Maurice, Louisiana
American film actresses
American television actresses
African-American actresses
American voice actresses
21st-century African-American people
21st-century African-American women
1982 births